Lancelot du Lac is a 1974 French fantasy drama film written and directed by Robert Bresson. It retells the story of Lancelot and Guinevere's love as Camelot and the Round Table fall apart. It is based on Arthurian legend and medieval romances, especially the Lancelot-Grail cycle, and the works of Chrétien de Troyes.

In common with Bresson's later films, the cast was composed of amateur actors, several of whom did not appear in any other film. Bresson's direction demanded a purposeful lack of emotion in the acting style, and reduced or eliminated the fantastical elements of the Grail legend. While much of the production is intentionally stylised as Medieval "Romance", the film is punctuated with moments of graphic violence.

Plot summary
King Arthur has sent out 100 knights to retrieve the Holy Grail. Arthur is dismayed when it turns out that the mission was futile and 70 knights have died in its course. Among those who have returned is Lancelot, the lover of Queen Guinevere. He is haunted by the death of his comrades and torn between his duty and his love for the Queen. He wishes to end the affair, but Guinevere refuses. She implies that instead of being slain by enemies, the knights sent for the Grail turned on one another, Lancelot chief among them. To make matters worse, many knights of Camelot either are wary of or outright despise Lancelot, who is seen as a favorite even among the Round Table, save for a few, among them Gawain and Lionel, who are his greatest friends among the knights' ranks.

Lancelot, falling once more to his love for Guinevere, wishes to forgo an upcoming tournament to go on a tryst with the Queen. Gawain tries to convinces him otherwise, but fails. En route to the tournament, Mordred (who earlier came upon Lancelot and Guinevere's secret meeting spot and discovering her scarf there and suspects Lancelot missing the tourney for the Queen) tries and fails to convince the King of the affair. Later on, during the tourney, a strange knight bearing a white shield vanquishes one knight after another. Gawain and Arthur recognizes the knight as Lancelot, through his horse and the way he rides. Lancelot goes on to take down more knights, Mordred among them, before making his leave. As he departs, he staggers and falls, obviously injured. Gawain is later informed by the jilted Queen that Lancelot has "disappeared" and the knight with the white shield could not be him. Lionel (who had wounded the knight of the white shield earlier) wishes to defend Lancelot's honor, but is stopped by Gawain, who sends riders in search for Lancelot, to no avail. It is then believed that Lancelot is dead. Gawain later seeks out the Queen at her secret meeting place, but Guinevere is resigned to her love with Lancelot and refuses to leave.

Gawain departs, only to be met Arthur accompanied with knights, Mordred, who had tipped his King off. The King immediately imprisons Queen Guinevere in the very same tower she and Lancelot once had their dalliances. Lancelot is later revealed to be hiding and recovering in Escalot, cared for by an aging farmer. With the help of Lionel and knights loyal to Lancelot, he breaks out the Queen, killing two knights (one of them being Agravain, Gawain's brother). Arthur starts immediately a campaign against the castle where the lovers were looking for shelter. The resulting battles result in many losses and casualties, among them Gawain. Despite this and his brother's death, he does not begrudge his once-friend and believes that though he and Arthur tried to save Guinevere, only Lancelot succeeded. He then dies of his wounds.

Guinevere, guilt-ridden over the blood spilt for their love, compels Lancelot to return her to Arthur, which he begrudgingly complies. He is later informed of Mordred's betrayal. Lancelot immediately chooses to ride against him, on Arthur's side. The resulting Battle of Camlann is a bloodbath in which none survive, including King Arthur and Mordred. Lancelot, the last man standing, staggers across the battlefield. Whispering Guinevere's name, he slumps over, dead, the last thing he sees being a falcon flying high.

Cast
 Luc Simon as Lancelot du Lac
 Laura Duke Condominas as Queen Guinevere 
 Humbert Balsan as Gauvain (Gawain)
 Vladimir Antolek-Oresek as King Arthur
 Patrick Bernhard as Mordred
 Arthur De Montalembert as Lionel
 Charles Balsan
 Christian Schlumberger
 Joseph-Patrick Le Quidre
 Jean-Paul Leperlier
 Marie-Louise Buffet
 Marie-Gabrielle Cartron
 Antoine Rabaud
 Jean-Marie Becar
 Guy de Bernis

Production
The film was shot from the end of June to the start of September 1973 in Noirmoutier-en-l'Île.
It was shot on 35 mm color film with an aspect ratio of 1.66 : 1.

Release
The film premiered at the 1974 Cannes Film Festival in May 1974, followed by its theatrical release in France on 26 September 1974. It had its world television premiere in West Germany on 4 May 1974.

Reception
The film was well-received among critics, currently holding a 95% "fresh" rating on Rotten Tomatoes based on 16 reviews.

It was Michael Haneke's second-place choice in the 2002 Sight & Sound poll of the greatest films ever made.

The film won the FIPRESCI Prize at the 1974 Cannes Film Festival.

David Lowery cites this movie as one of the inspirations behind The Green Knight, the adaption of the Arthurian legend, Sir Gawain and the Green Knight.

See also
 List of films based on Arthurian legend

References

External links
 
 

1974 films
French fantasy drama films
1970s French-language films
Films directed by Robert Bresson
Films set in England
Films set in the 6th century
Arthurian films
Films scored by Philippe Sarde
1970s fantasy drama films
1974 drama films
1970s French films